The fifth season of Friends, an American sitcom created by David Crane and Marta Kauffman, premiered on NBC on September 24, 1998. Friends was produced by Bright/Kauffman/Crane Productions, in association with Warner Bros. Television. The season contains 24 episodes and concluded airing on May 20, 1999.

Reception
Collider ranked it #2 on their ranking of the ten Friends seasons, and chose "The One Where Everybody Finds Out" as its best episode.
Digital Spy ranked it #4 on their ranking of the ten Friends seasons, and chose "The One Where Everybody Finds Out", "The One with the Cop" and "The One with the Ball" its best episodes.
Marie Claire ranked it #1 on her ranking of the ten seasons, and chose "The One Where Everybody Finds Out", "The One with All the Kissing" and "The One in Vegas: Part 2" its highlights. 
ScreenRant also ranked it #1 on their ranking of all seasons. 
BuzzFeed ranked it as #6 on their ranking, and chose "The One with All the Thanksgivings" as its best episode. 
WordPress ranked it #3 on their ranking. 
Listverse also ranked it #3 on their ranking.

Cast and characters

(In particular, Introduced in season 5 or Only in season 5)

Main cast
 Jennifer Aniston as Rachel Green
 Courteney Cox as Monica Geller
 Lisa Kudrow as Phoebe Buffay
 Matt LeBlanc  as Joey Tribbiani 
 Matthew Perry as Chandler Bing
 David Schwimmer as Ross Geller

Recurring cast
 James Michael Tyler as Gunther
 Helen Baxendale as Emily Waltham
 George Newbern as Danny
 Michael Ensign as Dr. Donald Ledbetter
 Michael Rapaport as Gary

Guest stars
 Maggie Wheeler as Janice Litman
 Elliott Gould as Jack Geller
 Christina Pickles as Judy Geller
 Jane Sibbett as Carol Willick
 Jessica Hecht as Susan Bunch
 Giovanni Ribisi as Frank Buffay, Jr.
 Debra Jo Rupp as Alice Knight
 Morgan Fairchild as Nora Bing
 June Gable as Estelle Leonard
 Bob Balaban as Frank Buffay, Sr.
 Tom Conti as Steven Waltham
 Jennifer Saunders as Andrea Waltham
 Zen Gesner as Dave
 Sam Anderson as Dr. Harad
 Patrick Fabian as Dan
 T.J. Thyne as Dr. Oberman
 Gregory Sporleder as Larry

 Iqbal Theba as Joey's doctor
 Gary Collins as himself
 Sam McMurray as Doug
 Soleil Moon Frye as Katie
 Willie Garson as Steve
 Joanna Gleason as Kim Clozzi
 Kristin Dattilo as Caitlin
 Lilyan Chauvin as Grandma Tribbiani
 Megan Ward as Nancy
 Thomas Lennon as Randall
 Jeanette Miller as the elderly woman
 Samantha Smith as Jen

Episodes

DVD release

Notes

References

External links
 

05
1998 American television seasons
1999 American television seasons